Frederick Kimball Young (born November 14, 1961) is a former professional American football player who played linebacker for seven seasons for the Seattle Seahawks and the Indianapolis Colts. He was selected to four Pro Bowls - two on the special teams and two as linebacker. He was renowned as a heavy hitter and was featured in the NFL film 'The NFL Crunch Course.'

Collegiate career
Young is a graduate of Woodrow Wilson High School in Dallas, Texas, the first high school to produce two Heisman Trophy winners. Young was a 2-year letterman in basketball and football. He received a full athletic scholarship to New Mexico State University (NMSU), was a part of the first-team all-Missouri Valley Conference from 1981 to 1983, the AP honorable mention all-American team in 1983, and the 1983 Sporting News honorable mention all-American team. He was voted to NMSU Hall of Fame and Aggie Legend, and he was drafted in the 3rd round of 1984 NFL draft, the 76th overall pick.

Professional career
Young's jersey number for the Seahawks was 50. He is perhaps most famous for being the Seattle Seahawks special teams player of the year for 1984-85, and a stalwart in the middle of the Seahawks defense from 1985 to 1987.
 
In May 1988, after four consecutive Pro Bowls and two All-Pro selections (for special teams and strong inside linebacker), he was traded to Indianapolis for the Colts' 1st round draft picks in 1989 and 1990.  He retired after three years in Indianapolis due to injuries.

References 
 

Top 40 greatest players in Seattle Seahawks history: No. 35 Fredd Young(1984–87)seattle timesSeattle Seahawks all time top 40 players: No.27 Fredd Young(1984–87)12th man rising

1961 births
Living people
Players of American football from Dallas
American football linebackers
Seattle Seahawks players
Indianapolis Colts players
American Conference Pro Bowl players
New Mexico State Aggies football players